The 2019 Men's EuroHockey Championship was the 17th edition of the EuroHockey Nations Championship, the biennial international men's field hockey championship of Europe organised by the European Hockey Federation.

It was held alongside the women's tournament from 16 to 24 August 2019 in Antwerp, Belgium. The tournament also served as a direct qualifier for the 2020 Tokyo Olympics, with the winner Belgium qualifying.

The hosts Belgium won their first-ever European title after beating Spain 5–0 in the final. The two-time defending champions the Netherlands won the bronze medal by defeating Germany 4–0.

Qualified teams

The following teams, shown with pre-tournament world rankings, participated in the 2019 EuroHockey Championship.

Format
The eight teams were split into two groups of four teams. The top two teams advanced to the semifinals to determine the winner in a knockout system. The bottom two teams played in a new group with the teams they did not play against in the group stage. The last two teams were relegated to the EuroHockey Championship II.

Squads

Results
All times are local (UTC+2).

Preliminary round

Pool A

Pool B

Fifth to eighth place classification

Pool C
The points obtained in the preliminary round against the other team were taken over.

First to fourth place classification

Semi-finals

Third and fourth place

Final

Statistics

Final standings

 Qualified for the 2020 Summer Olympics

 Relegated to the EuroHockey Championship II

Awards
The following awards were given at the conclusion of the tournament.

Goalscorers

See also
 2019 Men's EuroHockey Championship II
 2019 Men's EuroHockey Junior Championship
 2019 Women's EuroHockey Nations Championship

References

External links

 
Men's EuroHockey Nations Championship
Men 1
International field hockey competitions hosted by Belgium
EuroHockey Nations Championship
Field hockey at the Summer Olympics – Men's European qualification
Sports competitions in Antwerp
2010s in Antwerp
EuroHockey Championship I Men